Shame (German: Schande) is a 1922 German silent drama film directed by Siegfried Dessauer and starring Lilly Flohr, Gerda Frey and Robert Scholz.

Cast
 Lilly Flohr as Irm Bernardi 
 Gerda Frey as Sylvia - ihre Schwester 
 Robert Scholz as Peter Dorn 
 Anna von Palen
 Fritz Kampers
 Curt Cappi
 Sophie Pagay
 Paul Müller

References

Bibliography
 Grange, William. Cultural Chronicle of the Weimar Republic. Scarecrow Press, 2008.

External links

1922 films
Films of the Weimar Republic
Films directed by Siegfried Dessauer
German silent feature films
German black-and-white films
German drama films
1922 drama films
Silent drama films
1920s German films